1-2-3 is an unmanned fuel station chain in the Nordic and Baltic regions.

It was created in 2000, as the low cost extension of the Statoil chain, and owned by Statoil Fuel & Retail ASA. The first outlet was opened in Kaunas in December 2000. 65 outlets were planned in the Baltic, later to be supplemented by 107 outlets in Norway and Denmark. Unlike the Statoil stations, there are no franchisees, and all stations are vertically integrated.

References

Filling stations
Norwegian brands
Retail companies established in 2000
Statoil Fuel & Retail
2000 establishments in Lithuania
Retail companies of Norway